Ettupulikkadu is a village in the Pattukkottai taluk of Thanjavur district, Tamil Nadu, India.

Demographics 

As per the 2001 census, Ettupulikkadu had a total population of 1663 with 828 males and 835 females. The sex ratio was 1008. The literacy rate was 59.33.

References 

 

Villages in Thanjavur district